William Walker (May 8, 1824September 12, 1860) was an American physician, lawyer, journalist, and mercenary.  In the era of the expansion of the United States, driven by the doctrine of  "manifest destiny", Walker organized unauthorized military expeditions into Mexico and Central America with the intention of establishing private colonies.  Such an enterprise was known at the time as "filibustering".

After settling in California and motivated by an earlier filibustering project of Gaston de Raousset-Boulbon, Walker attempted in 1853–54 to take Baja California and Sonora.  He declared those territories to be an independent Republic of Sonora, but he was soon driven back to California by the Mexican forces.  Walker then went to Nicaragua in 1855 as leader of a mercenary army employed by the Nicaraguan Democratic Party in its civil war against the Legitimists.  He took control of the Nicaraguan government and in July 1856 set himself up as the country's president.

Walker's regime was recognized as the legitimate government of Nicaragua by US President Franklin Pierce and it initially enjoyed the support of some important sectors within Nicaraguan society.  However, Walker antagonized the powerful Wall Street tycoon Cornelius Vanderbilt by expropriating Vanderbilt's Accessory Transit Company, which operated one of the main routes for the transport of passengers going from New York City to San Francisco. The British Empire saw Walker as a threat to its interests in the possible construction of a Nicaragua Canal. As ruler of Nicaragua, Walker re-legalized slavery and threatened the independence of neighboring Central American republics.  A military coalition led by Costa Rica defeated Walker and forced him to resign the presidency of Nicaragua on May 1, 1857.

Walker then tried to re-launch his filibustering project and in 1860 he published a book, The War in Nicaragua, which cast his efforts to conquer Central America as tied to the geographical expansion of slavery.  In that way, Walker sought to gain renewed support from pro-slavery forces in the Southern United States, in the eve of the American Civil War. That same year Walker returned to Central America, but was arrested by the Royal Navy, who handed him over to the Honduran government which executed him.

Early life
William Walker was born in Nashville, Tennessee, in 1824 to James Walker and his wife Mary Norvell. His father was an English settler. His mother was the daughter of Lipscomb Norvell, an American Revolutionary War officer from Virginia. One of Walker's maternal uncles was John Norvell, a U.S. Senator from Michigan and founder of The Philadelphia Inquirer. Walker was engaged to Ellen Martin, but she died of yellow fever before they could be married, and he died without children.

Walker graduated summa cum laude from the University of Nashville at the age of 14. In 1843, at the age of 19, he received a medical degree from the University of Pennsylvania. Walker then continued his medical studies at Edinburgh and Heidelberg. He practiced medicine briefly in Philadelphia, but soon moved to New Orleans where he studied law privately.

Walker practiced law for a short time, then quit to become co-owner and editor of the New Orleans Crescent newspaper. In 1849, he moved to San Francisco, where he worked as editor of the San Francisco Herald and fought three duels; he was wounded in two of them. Walker then conceived the idea of conquering vast regions of Central America and creating new slave states to join those already part of the Union. These campaigns were known as filibustering, or freebooting, and were supported by the Southern expansionist secret society, the Knights of the Golden Circle.

Duel with William Hicks Graham
Walker gained national attention by dueling with law clerk William Hicks Graham on January 12, 1851. Walker criticized Graham and his colleagues in the Herald, which angered Graham and prompted him to challenge Walker to a duel. Graham was a notorious gunman, having taken part in a number of duels and shootouts in the Old West. Walker, on the other hand, had experience dueling with single-shot pistols at one time, but his duel with Graham was fought with revolvers.

The combatants met at Mission Dolores, where each was given a Colt Dragoon with five shots. They stood face to face at ten paces, and each aimed and fired at the signal of a referee. Graham managed to fire two bullets, hitting Walker in his pantaloons and his thigh, seriously wounding him. Walker tried a number of times to shoot his weapon, but he failed to land even a single shot and Graham was left unscathed. The duel ended when Walker conceded. Graham was arrested but was quickly released. The duel was recorded in The Daily Alta California.

Invasion of Mexico
In the summer of 1853, Walker traveled to Guaymas in Mexico, seeking a grant from the Mexican government to establish a colony. He proposed that his colony would serve as a fortified frontier, protecting U.S. soil from Indian raids. Mexico refused, and Walker returned to San Francisco determined to obtain his colony regardless of Mexico's position. He began recruiting American supporters of slavery and of the Manifest Destiny doctrine, mostly inhabitants of Tennessee and Kentucky. Walker's plans then expanded from forming a buffer colony to establishing an independent Republic of Sonora, which might eventually take its place as a part of the Union (as the Republic of Texas had done in 1845). He funded his project by "selling scrips which were redeemable in lands of Sonora".

On October 15, 1853, Walker set out with forty-five men to conquer the Mexican territories of Baja California Territory and Sonora State. He succeeded in capturing La Paz, the capital of sparsely populated Baja California, which he declared the capital of a new "Republic of Lower California" (declared November 3, 1853), with himself as president and his former law partner, Henry P. Watkins, as vice president. Walker then put the region under the laws of the American state of Louisiana, which made slavery legal. Whether Walker at this stage intended to tie his filibustering expedition to the cause of slavery is a matter of dispute.

Fearful of attacks by Mexico, Walker moved his headquarters twice over the next three months, first to Cabo San Lucas, and then further north to Ensenada to maintain a more secure base of operations. Although he never gained control of Sonora, less than three months later, he pronounced Baja California part of the larger Republic of Sonora. Lack of supplies and strong resistance by the Mexican government quickly forced Walker to retreat.

Back in California, Walker was indicted by a federal grand jury for waging an illegal war in violation of the Neutrality Act of 1794. However, in the era of Manifest Destiny, Walker's filibustering project had popular support in the southern and western U.S. Walker was tried before Judge I. S. K. Ogier in the US District Court for the Southern District of California. Although two of Walker's associates had already been convicted of similar charges and Judge Ogier summarized the evidence against Walker for the jury, the jury deliberated for only eight minutes before acquitting Walker.

Invasion of Nicaragua

Since there was no inter-oceanic route between the Atlantic and Pacific Oceans at the time, and the transcontinental railway did not yet exist, a major trade route between New York City and San Francisco ran through southern Nicaragua. Ships from New York entered the San Juan River from the Atlantic and sailed across Lake Nicaragua. People and goods were then transported by stagecoach across a narrow strip of land near the city of Rivas, before reaching the Pacific and ships to San Francisco. The commercial exploitation of this route had been granted by Nicaragua to the Accessory Transit Company, controlled by shipping magnate Cornelius Vanderbilt.

In 1854, a civil war erupted in Nicaragua between the Legitimist Party (also called the Conservative Party), based in the city of Granada, and the Democratic Party (also called the Liberal Party), based in León. The Democratic Party sought military support from Walker who, to circumvent U.S. neutrality laws, obtained a contract from Democratic president Francisco Castellón to bring as many as three hundred "colonists" to Nicaragua. These mercenaries received the right to bear arms in the service of the Democratic government. Walker sailed from San Francisco on May 3, 1855, with approximately sixty men. Upon landing, the force was reinforced by 110 locals. With Walker's expeditionary force was the well-known explorer and journalist Charles Wilkins Webber, as well as Belgian-born adventurer Charles Frederick Henningsen, a veteran of the First Carlist War, the Hungarian Revolution, and the war in Circassia. Besides Henningsen, three members of Walker's forces who became Confederate officers were Birkett D. Fry, Robert C. Tyler, and Chatham Roberdeau Wheat.

With Castellón's consent, Walker attacked the Legitimists in Rivas, near the trans-isthmian route. He was driven off, but not without inflicting heavy casualties. In this First Battle of Rivas, a school teacher called Enmanuel Mongalo y Rubio (1834–1872) burned the Filibuster headquarters. On September 3, during the Battle of La Virgen, Walker defeated the Legitimist army. On October 13, he conquered Granada and took effective control of the country. Initially, as commander of the army, Walker ruled Nicaragua through provisional President Patricio Rivas. U.S. President Franklin Pierce recognized Walker's regime as the legitimate government of Nicaragua on May 20, 1856, and on June 3 the Democratic national convention expressed support of the effort to "regenerate" Nicaragua. However, Walker's first ambassadorial appointment, Colonel Parker H. French, was refused recognition. On September 22, Walker repealed Nicaraguan laws prohibiting slavery, in an attempt to gain support from the Southern states.

Walker's actions in the region caused concern in neighboring countries and potential U.S. and European investors who feared he would pursue further military conquests in Central America. C. K. Garrison and Charles Morgan, subordinates of Vanderbilt's Accessory Transit Company, provided financial and logistical support to the Filibusters in exchange for Walker, as ruler of Nicaragua, seizing the company's property (on the pretext of a charter violation) and turning it over to Garrison and Morgan. Outraged, Vanderbilt dispatched two secret agents to the Costa Rican government with plans to fight Walker. They would help regain control of Vanderbilt's steamboats which had become a logistical lifeline for Walker's army.

Concerned about Walker's intentions in the region, Costa Rican President Juan Rafael Mora Porras rejected his diplomatic overtures and began preparing the country's military for a potential conflict. Walker organized a battalion of four companies, of which one was composed of Germans, a second of Frenchmen, and the other two of Americans, totaling 240 men placed under the command of Colonel Schlessinger to invade Costa Rica in a preemptive action. This advance force was defeated at the Battle of Santa Rosa on March 20, 1856.

The most important strategic defeat of Walker came during the Campaign of 1856–57 when the Costa Rican army, led by Porras, General José Joaquín Mora Porras (the president's brother), and General José María Cañas (1809–1860), defeated the Filibusters in Rivas on April 11, 1856 (the Second Battle of Rivas). It was in this battle that the soldier and drummer Juan Santamaría sacrificed himself by setting the Filibuster stronghold on fire. In parallel with Enmanuel Mongalo y Rubio in Nicaragua, Santamaría would become Costa Rica's national hero. Walker deliberately contaminated the water wells of Rivas with corpses. Later, a cholera epidemic spread to the Costa Rican troops and the civilian population of Rivas. Within a few months nearly 10,000 civilians had died, almost ten percent of the population of Costa Rica.

From the north, President José Santos Guardiola sent Honduran troops under the leadership of the Xatruch brothers, who joined Salvadoran troops to fight Walker. Florencio Xatruch led his troops against Walker and the filibusters in la Puebla, Rivas. Later, because of the opposition of other Central American armies, José Joaquín Mora Porras was made Commandant General-in-Chief of the Allied Armies of Central America in the Third Battle of Rivas (April 1857).

During this civil war, Honduras and El Salvador recognized Xatruch as brigade and division general. On June 12, 1857, after Walker surrendered, Xatruch made a triumphant entrance to Comayagua, which was then the capital of Honduras. Both the nickname by which Hondurans are known today, Catracho, and the more infamous nickname for Salvadorans, "Salvatrucho", are derived from Xatruch's figure and successful campaign as leader of the allied armies of Central America, as the troops of El Salvador and Honduras were national heroes, fighting side by side as Central American brothers against William Walker's troops.

As the general and his soldiers returned from battle, some Nicaraguans affectionately yelled out  ("Here come Xatruch's boys!") However, Nicaraguans had trouble pronouncing the general's Catalan name, so they altered the phrase to "los catruches" and ultimately to "los catrachos".

A key role was played by the Costa Rican Army in unifying the other Central American armies to fight against Filibusters. The "Campaign of the Transit" (1857) is the name given by Costa Rican historians to the groups of several battles fought by the Costa Rican Army, supervised by Colonel Salvador Mora, and led by Colonel Blanco and Colonel Salazar at the San Juan River. By establishing control of this bi-national river at its border with Nicaragua, Costa Rica prevented military reinforcements from reaching Walker and his Filibuster troops via the Caribbean Sea. Also Costa Rican diplomacy neutralized U.S. official support for Walker by taking advantage of the dispute between the magnate Cornelius Vanderbilt and William Walker.

Walker took up residence in Granada and set himself up as President of Nicaragua, after conducting a fraudulent election. He was inaugurated on July 12, 1856, and soon launched an Americanization program, reinstating slavery, declaring English an official language, and reorganizing currency and fiscal policy to encourage emigration from the United States. Realizing that his position was becoming precarious, he sought support from the Southerners in the U.S. by recasting his campaign as a fight to spread the institution of black slavery, which was the basis of the Southern agrarian economy. With this in mind, Walker revoked Nicaragua's emancipation edict of 1821. This move increased Walker's popularity among Southern whites and attracted the attention of Pierre Soulé, an influential New Orleans politician, who campaigned to raise support for Walker's war. Nevertheless, Walker's army was weakened by massive defections and an epidemic of cholera, and was finally defeated by the Central American coalition led by Costa Rican President Juan Rafael Mora Porras (1814–1860).

On October 12, 1856, Guatemalan Colonel José Víctor Zavala crossed the square of the city to the house where Walker's soldiers took shelter. Under heavy fire, he reached the enemy's flag and carried it back with him, shouting to his men that the Filibuster bullets did not kill.

On December 14, 1856, as Granada was surrounded by 4,000 troops from Costa Rica, Honduras, El Salvador, and Guatemala, along with independent Nicaraguan allies, Charles Frederick Henningsen, one of Walker's generals, ordered his men to set the city ablaze before escaping and fighting their way to Lake Nicaragua. When retreating from Granada, the oldest Spanish colonial city in Nicaragua, he left a detachment with orders to level it in order to instill, as he put it, "a salutary dread of American justice". It took them over two weeks to smash, burn and flatten the city; all that remained were inscriptions on the ruins that read  ("Here was Granada").

On May 1, 1857, Walker surrendered to Commander Charles Henry Davis of the United States Navy under the pressure of Costa Rica and the Central American armies, and was repatriated. Upon disembarking in New York City, he was greeted as a hero, but he alienated public opinion when he blamed his defeat on the U.S. Navy. Within six months, he set off on another expedition, but he was arrested by the U.S. Navy Home Squadron under the command of Commodore Hiram Paulding and once again returned to the U.S. amid considerable public controversy over the legality of the navy's actions.

Conviction and execution

After writing an account of his Central American campaign (published in 1860 as War in Nicaragua), Walker once again returned to the region. British colonists in Roatán, Bay Islands, fearing that the Honduran government would move to assert its control over them, approached Walker with an offer to help him in establishing an independent, English-speaking administration over the islands. Walker disembarked in the port city of Trujillo, but was arrested by Royal Navy officer Nowell Salmon. The British controlled the neighboring regions of Honduras and the Mosquito Coast and had considerable strategic and economic interest in the construction of an inter-oceanic canal through Central America; Britain therefore regarded Walker as a menace to its own affairs in the region.

Rather than return him to the U.S., for reasons that remain unclear, Salmon sailed to Trujillo and handed Walker over to the Honduran government along with his chief of staff, Colonel A. F. Rudler. Rudler was sentenced to four years of hard labor in Honduran mines, but Walker was sentenced to death, and executed by firing squad, near the site of the present-day hospital, on September 12, 1860. William Walker was 36 years old. He is buried in the "Old Cemetery", Trujillo, Colón, Honduras.

Influence and reputation
William Walker convinced many Southerners of the desirability of creating a slave-holding empire in tropical Latin America. In 1861, when U.S. Senator John J. Crittenden proposed that the 36°30' parallel north be declared as a line of demarcation between free and slave territories, some Republicans denounced such an arrangement, saying that it "would amount to a perpetual covenant of war against every people, tribe, and State owning a foot of land between here and Tierra del Fuego".

Before the end of the American Civil War, Walker's memory enjoyed great popularity in the southern and western United States, where he was known as "General Walker" and as the "gray-eyed man of destiny". Northerners, on the other hand, generally regarded him as a pirate. Despite his intelligence and personal charm, Walker consistently proved to be a limited military and political leader. Unlike men of similar ambition, such as Cecil Rhodes, Walker's grandiose scheming ultimately failed.

In Central American countries, the successful military campaign of 1856–1857 against William Walker became a source of national pride and identity, and it was later promoted by local historians and politicians as substitute for the war of independence that Central America had not experienced. April 11 is a Costa Rican national holiday in memory of Walker's defeat at Rivas. Juan Santamaría, who played a key role in that battle, is honored as one of two Costa Rican national heroes, the other one being Juan Rafael Mora himself. The main airport serving San José (in Alajuela) is named in Santamaría's honor.

To this day, a sense of Central American "coalition" among the "catracho" nations of Costa Rica, Honduras, El Salvador, and Guatemala, along with independent Nicaraguan allies, is remembered and celebrated as a unifying shared history.

Cultural references

Walker's campaigns in Lower California and Nicaragua are the subject of a historical novel by Alfred Neumann, published in German as Der Pakt (1949), and translated in English as Strange Conquest (a previous UK edition was published as Look Upon This Man).
Walker's campaign in Nicaragua has inspired two films, both of which take considerable liberties with his story: Burn! (1969) directed by Gillo Pontecorvo, starring Marlon Brando, and Walker (1987) directed by Alex Cox, starring Ed Harris. Walker's name is used for the main character in Burn!, though the character is not meant to represent the historical William Walker and is portrayed as British. On the other hand, Alex Cox's Walker incorporates into its surrealist narrative many of the signposts of William Walker's life and exploits, including his original excursions into northern Mexico to his trial and acquittal on breaking the neutrality act to the triumph of his assault on Nicaragua and his execution.

In Part Five, Chapter 48, of Gone with the Wind, Margaret Mitchell cites William Walker, "and how he died against a wall in Truxillo", as a topic of conversation between Rhett Butler and his filibustering acquaintances, while Rhett and Scarlett O'Hara are on honeymoon in New Orleans.

A poem written by Nicaraguan Catholic priest and minister of culture from 1979 to 1987 during the Sandinista period Ernesto Cardenal, Con Walker En Nicaragua, translated as With Walker in Nicaragua, gives a historical treatment of the affair from the Nicaraguan perspective.

The villain of the Nantucket series, by science fiction writer S. M. Stirling, is a 20th-century American mercenary named William Walker, who is time-displaced from AD 1998 to 1250 BC. Walker demonstrates a similar personality to his historical namesake, leading a kind of filibuster force to Mycenaean Greece and initiating a version of the Trojan War with machine guns.

John Neal's 1859 novel True Womanhood includes a character who travels from the US to Nicaragua. When he returns, it turns out he has been involved in Walker's campaign there. This may be based on his son James or his friend's son, Appleton Oaksmith, both of whom made the trip and were involved with Walker in that country.

Works
 Walker, William.  The War in Nicaragua.  New York (NY): S.H. Goetzel, 1860.

See also
 Gaston de Raousset-Boulbon
 Knights of the Golden Circle, a secret society interested in annexing territories in Mexico, Central America, and the Caribbean to be added to the United States as slave states
 Nicaragua Canal
 Panama Canal
 Florencio Xatruch

Notes

References

Secondary sources
 Carr, Albert Z. The World and William Walker, 1963.
 Dando-Collins, Stephen. Tycoon's War: How Cornelius Vanderbilt Invaded a Country to Overthrow America's Most Famous Military Adventurer (2008) excerpt and text search
 
 
 Gobat, Michel. Empire by Invitation:  William Walker and Manifest Destiny in Central America (Harvard UP, 2018) roundtable evaluation by scholars at H-Diplo
 Juda, Fanny. California Filibusters: A History of their Expeditions into Hispanic America
 
 
 
 
 Moore, J. Preston.  "Pierre Soule: Southern Expansionist and Promoter," Journal of Southern History 21:2 (May, 1955), 208 & 214.
 Norvell, John Edward, "How Tennessee Adventurer William Walker became Dictator of Nicaragua in 1857: The Norvell Family origins of the Grey Eyed Man of Destiny," The Middle Tennessee Journal of Genealogy and History, Vol XXV, No. 4,  Spring 2012
 "1855: American Conquistador," American Heritage, October 2005.
 Recko, Corey. "Murder on the White Sands." University of North Texas Press. 2007
 
 "William Walker" Encyclopædia Britannica. 2008. Encyclopædia Britannica Online. 28 Oct. 2008.

Primary sources
 Doubleday, C.W.  Reminiscences of the Filibuster War in Nicaragua.  New York: G.P. Putnam's Sons, 1886.
 Jamison, James Carson. With Walker in Nicaragua: Reminiscences of an Officer of the American Phalanx.  Columbia, MO: E.W. Stephens, 1909.
 Wight, Samuel F.  Adventures in California and Nicaragua: a Truthful Epic.  Boston: Alfred Mudge & Son, 1860.
 Fayssoux Collection.  Tulane University.  Latin American Library.
 United States Magazine. Sept., 1856. Vol III No. 3. pp. 266–72
 "Filibustering", Putnam's Monthly Magazine (New York), April 1857, 425–35.
 "Walker's Reverses in Nicaragua," Anti-Slavery Bugle, November 17, 1856.
 "The Lesson" National Era, June 4, 1857, 90.
 "The Administration and Commodore Paulding," National Era, January 7, 1858.
 "Wanted – A Few Filibusters," Harper's Weekly, January 10, 1857.
 "Reception of Gen. Walker," New Orleans Picayune, May 28, 1857.
 "Arrival of Walker," New Orleans Picayune, May 28, 1857.
 "Our Influence in the Isthmus," New Orleans Picayune, February 17, 1856.
  New Orleans Sunday Delta, June 27, 1856.
 "Nicaragua and President Walker," Louisville Times, December 13, 1856.
 "Le Nicaragua et les Filibustiers," Opelousas Courier, May 10, 1856.
 "What is to Become of Nicaragua?," Harper's Weekly, June 6, 1857.
 "The Late General Walker," Harper's Weekly, October 13, 1860.
 "What General Walker is Like," Harper's Weekly, September, 1856.
 "Message of the President to the Senate in Reference to the Late Arrest of Gen. Walker,"  Louisville Courier, January 12, 1858.
 "The Central American Question – What Walker May Do," New York Times, January 1, 1856.
 "A Serious Farce," New York Times, December 14, 1853.
 1856–57 New York Herald Horace Greeley editorials.

Further reading
 Harrison, Brady. William Walker and the Imperial Self in American Literature. Athens, Ga.: University of Georgia Press, 2004. .
 Coleman, Kevin. "William Walker, Liberal Imperialist." Diplomatic History, Volume 44, Issue 1, January 2020, pp. 165–168
 Deville, Patrick, Pura Vida: Vie et mort de William Walker, Seuil, Paris, 2004 
 Scroggs, William O., Ph.D., Professor of Economics and Sociology in Louisiana State University. Filibusters and Financiers: the Story of William Walker and his Associates. New York: The Macmillan Company, 1916.

External links

 "Commodore Cornelius Vanderbilt fought war over route through Central America" from the Vanderbilt Register
 "Walker's expeditions" from GlobalSecurity.org
 "Filibustering with William Walker" from the Virtual Museum of the City of San Francisco
 Fuchik, Don "The Saga of William Walker" The California Native Newsletter
 Walker the 1987 Alex Cox movie, Walker, featuring Ed Harris as William Walker, at the Internet Movie Database
 "How Tennessee Adventurer William Walker became Dictator of Nicaragua in 1857 The Norvell family origins of The Grey Eyed Man of Destiny"
 The memory palace podcast episode about William Walker. 
 Walker, William "The War in Nicaragua" at Google Books
 Brief recount of William Walker trying to conquer Baja California 
 With Walker in Nicaragua by Ernesto Cardenal, translated by Jonathan Cohen
 Maps of North America and the Caribbean showing Walker's expeditions at omniatlas.com

People from Nashville, Tennessee
Executed presidents
American filibusters (military)
American duellists
Leaders who took power by coup
Presidents of Nicaragua
American people of Scottish descent
University of Nashville alumni
Perelman School of Medicine at the University of Pennsylvania alumni
Alumni of the University of Edinburgh Medical School
American people executed abroad
People executed by Honduras by firing squad
1824 births
1860 deaths
Executed Nicaraguan people
19th-century executions of American people
Executed people from Tennessee
19th-century Nicaraguan people
19th-century American journalists
American male journalists
American shooting survivors
Norvell family
19th-century male writers
American proslavery activists